Go Go Squid! is a 2019 Chinese television series starring Yang Zi and Li Xian The series is about how Tong Nian, a talented computer major who is also a popular online singer and Han Shangyan, a cybersecurity professional fall in love, support each other and strive to win prizes in international cybersecurity competitions.

Episodes

Notes

References 

Lists of Chinese television series episodes